Levski Playing Field was the original stadium of Levski Sofia football club. It was commissioned in 1924 and completed in 1934. In 1944 it had a seating capacity of 10,000.

The stadium was demolished after 1949 by the authorities to make place for the Vasil Levski National Stadium.

References 

Sports venues in Sofia
PFC Levski Sofia
Sports venues completed in 1934
1934 establishments in Bulgaria